Denis Pack-Beresford may refer to:

Denis Pack-Beresford (politician) (1818–1881), Irish Conservative politician
Denis Robert Pack-Beresford (1864–1942), Irish entomologist and arachnologist, son of the above

See also
Denis Pack, military officer